Cheston is both a surname and a given name. Notable people with the name include:

Ernest Cheston (1848–1918), English rugby player
Evelyn Cheston (1875-1929), English artist
Sheila C. Cheston (born c. 1960), American lawyer
Cheston Lee Eshelman (1917–2004), American inventor and businessman

See also
Cheston, Devon, a settlement in southwest England